Ganja Fortress, is a fortress in Ganja, Azerbaijan. The remains of walls of the fortress can be seen in the territory of the oldest park of the city, Khan's Garden and in the entrance to the city, along the Ganja River.

History
Farhad Pasha, who headed the Turkish army in the Caucasus, went to Ganja, controlled by the Safavids, by the order of Sultan Murad III. Ganja was captured on 1 September 1588. After taking Ganja, on 3 September 1588, Pasha ordered the construction of the castle 7–8 kilometers from the city. It was built in a flat area and on the left bank of the Ganja River. Ganja was divided into four parts by the fortress in the 16th century: the outer city, Shahristan, Ichgala and Naringala.

In 1868, after Ganja became the regional center of the Caucasus, a new master plan for the city was prepared by architect Ignati Kshishtalovic. After the master plan was approved in 1873 by Alexander II, the walls of the fortress were demolished and European-styled neighborhoods were built.  At present, a very small part of the Ganja fortress – Shiralibey tower – remains. In 2007, the fortress wall was renovated.

Architectural features 
While building the castle, some neighborhoods of Ganja were kept outside the walls of the fortress. It was built in an uneven polygonal shape. In the construction of the fortress, clay-mud, cobblestones and baked red bricks – traditional Ganja architecture – were used. For that reason its south-west, north-west, and north-east walls were strong. A total of 30 defensive towers were built across the wall every .

At certain height of the fortress walls, embrasures and watchtowers were constructed. They were important to use to attack the enemy. From those places, local fighters used to spill boiling oil and lubricant on attacking enemies.

Gallery

See also
Battle of Ganja (1804)
Architecture of Azerbaijan

References

Castles and fortresses in Azerbaijan
Palaces in Azerbaijan
Tourist attractions in Azerbaijan